Chiwawa Mountain is an  mountain summit located in the Glacier Peak Wilderness of the North Cascades in Washington state. The mountain is situated on the crest of the Cascade Range, on the shared border of Snohomish County and Chelan County, also straddling the boundary between the Mount Baker-Snoqualmie National Forest and the Wenatchee National Forest. Its nearest higher peak is  Fortress Mountain,  to the west. Chiwawa Mountain is a triple divide peak, so precipitation runoff from it drains northeast to Lake Chelan via Railroad Creek; northwest into Miners Creek which is a tributary of the Suiattle River; and south into the Chiwawa River headwaters. The mountain's name is taken from the river's name, which was applied by Albert Hale Sylvester (1871-1944), a pioneer surveyor, explorer, topographer, and forest supervisor in the Cascades. Chiwawa comes from the Columbia-Moses language and means a kind of creek ("wawa" creek).

Geology

During the Pleistocene period dating back over two million years ago, glaciation advancing and retreating repeatedly scoured and shaped the landscape. Remnants of the Lyman Glacier remain on the northeast slope of Chiwawa Mountain. Uplift and faulting in combination with glaciation have been the dominant processes which have created the tall peaks and deep valleys of the North Cascades area.
Extensive volcanic activity began to take place in the oligocene, about 35 million years ago. Due to Glacier Peak's proximity to Chiwawa Mountain, volcanic ash is common in the area.

Climate
Chiwawa Mountain  is located in the marine west coast climate zone of western North America. Most weather fronts originate in the Pacific Ocean, and travel northeast toward the Cascade Mountains. As fronts approach the North Cascades, they are forced upward by the peaks of the Cascade Range, causing them to drop their moisture in the form of rain or snowfall onto the Cascades (Orographic lift). As a result, the west side of the North Cascades experiences high precipitation, especially during the winter months in the form of snowfall. Due to its temperate climate and proximity to the Pacific Ocean, areas west of the Cascade Crest very rarely experience temperatures below  or above . During winter months, weather is usually cloudy, but, due to high pressure systems over the Pacific Ocean that intensify during summer months, there is often little or no cloud cover during the summer. Because of maritime influence, snow tends to be wet and heavy, resulting in high avalanche danger.

See also

List of mountain peaks of Washington (state)

Gallery

References

External links
 Weather forecast: Chiwawa Mountain

Mountains of Washington (state)
Mountains of Chelan County, Washington
Mountains of Snohomish County, Washington
Cascade Range